Daniel Joseph Dilworth (born February 23, 1942, in International Falls, Minnesota - d. September 27, 2007) was an American ice hockey player who competed in the 1964 Winter Olympics.

In 1964 he participated with the American ice hockey team in the Winter Olympics tournament.

See also
List of Olympic men's ice hockey players for the United States

References

External links

1942 births
2007 deaths
Ice hockey players from Minnesota
Ice hockey players at the 1964 Winter Olympics
Olympic ice hockey players of the United States
People from International Falls, Minnesota
American men's ice hockey right wingers
St. Paul Saints (IHL) players